Patricio "Pato" Botello Faz (born 8 September 1996) is a Mexican professional footballer who plays as a forward for Las Vegas Lights in the USL Championship.

References

External links
 
 
 St. Mary's Rattlers bio

1996 births
Living people
Association football forwards
St. Mary's Rattlers men's soccer players
Corpus Christi FC players
Lansing Ignite FC players
Tormenta FC players
USL League One players
USL League Two players
Mexican expatriate footballers
Mexican expatriate sportspeople in the United States
Expatriate soccer players in the United States
Footballers from Nuevo León
Sportspeople from Monterrey
Detroit City FC players
National Independent Soccer Association players
Las Vegas Lights FC players
Mexican footballers